Tushar Kalia (born 7 March) is an Indian choreographer, dancer and actor. He specialises in Mayurbhanj Chhau Odisha, Kalari and Contemporary dance forms. He is the winner of Khatron Ke Khiladi Season 12 (2022). Kalia participated in the dance reality shows, Jhalak Dikhhla Jaa 6 (2013) and Jhalak Dikhhla Jaa 7 (2014) as a choreographer. He was also the stage director of the reality show India's Got Talent (2015—2016) in its 6th and 7th season.

Personal life
Kalia was born in Chandigarh, India. In 2022 he got engaged to model, Triveni Barman, in presence of family members and close friends.

Career 
Kalia started his career as a choreographer in Bollywood after his first break in Karan Johar's film Ae Dil Hai Mushkil and judged the dance reality show Dance Deewane. He also choreographed in films like Half Girlfriend, War, The Zoya Factor, Junglee, Ok Jaanu, Hate Story 4, and Dhadak.

Kalia began his dancing and directing Shri Santosh Nair, the creative director of Sadhya Unit of Performing Arts. He is also trained under Canadian choreographer, Brandy Leary for Ariel technique dancing. Kalia has performed with international choreographers for a production in Birmingham, titled, Motherland. He also appeared as an actor in Hindi feature film, ABCD: Any Body Can Dance.

Filmography

Television

Film

Music video

Awards

References

External links

Indian male dancers
Living people
Indian choreographers
Fear Factor: Khatron Ke Khiladi participants
Year of birth missing (living people)